Hugo Hendrik Biermann,  (6 August 1916 – 27 March 2012) was a senior officer in the South African Navy. He served as Chief of the Navy from 1952 to 1972 and Chief of the South African Defence Force from 1972 until 1976, the only naval officer to have served in the post.

Early life

Biermann's father, also named Hugo Hendrick, joined the Orange Free State postal service at the age of 12, and later joined the South African Railways and Harbours as a telegraphist. Born in Johannesburg on 6 August 1916, Biermann was one of four children. His brothers Phillip and Stefanus (Chips) served on whalecatchers that had been converted to minesweepers during the Second World War. His brother Stefanus reached the rank of rear admiral in the South African Navy. Biermann started school in the Transvaal until his father was transferred to Cape Town. He completed his schooling at Jan van Riebeeck High School and, after leaving school at the age of 16, joined the South African Training Ship General Botha.

After two years training on the General Botha from 1932 to 1933, Biermann entered the British Merchant Navy as a cadet and served until 1938, when he was transferred to the Maritime Department of the South African Railways and Harbours.

Career

Second World War

Biermann began his naval career in 1938 as a sub-lieutenant in the Royal Naval Volunteer Reserve. In January 1940, he was called up for full-time service and transferred to the Seaward Defence Force. Promoted lieutenant in mid 1941 he commanded ,

The crew of the HMSAS Gamtoos cleared several Mediterranean ports of sunken and scuttled ships, and at Marseilles, Biermann blew a hole in the harbour wall so that he could enter the Vieux Port and begin work. The Gamtoos went on to salvage the Sidi Aissa, towing it away to clear the valuable graving dock at La Ciotat by 14 December 1944. This earned Biermann appointment as an Officer of the Order of the British Empire (OBE) (Military Division). The citation for his OBE reads:

Post-war and rise to senior command

After the Second World War, and with the establishment of the South African Navy (Permanent Force) in May 1946, Biermann was appointed lieutenant commander in the Permanent Force and made captain of the Algerine class minesweeper, commissioning it in Devonport on 8 September 1947. He was also the Senior Officer of the minesweeping squadron.

In 1950, Biermann was transferred to Defence Headquarters and served on the staff of the then Director-General of the South African Naval Forces. Two years later he attended the British Naval Staff Course at the Royal Naval College, Greenwich, and was appointed as naval attaché at South African House, London with the rank of commander.

Frans Erasmus reshuffle

Minister Frans Erasmus embarked on a process of ridding the Defence Force of officers associated with the Smuts government and replacing them with others whom he considered more Nationalist, one which Afrikaners would feel more at home. In 1952, Erasmus posted Brigadier Pieter de Waal as a Military attache to the United States, replacing him with Biermann, one of only seven Afrikaans officers in the navy in 1948. Then Commander Biermann was appointed Naval and Marine Chief of Staff (the head of the navy) on 1 December 1952, and promoted to the rank of commodore, jumping two ranks. During his tenure the Simonstown Agreement was signed on 30 June 1955. He held commodore rank until 1 April 1957, with the handing over of the Simon's Town Naval Base, he was promoted to rear admiral. Biermann was made vice admiral on 1 December 1965, when his position was simultaneously retitled as Chief of the Navy.

In 1972, Biermann took over the position of Commandant General of the South African Defence Force and promoted to Admiral, the first time this rank was used in the South African Navy. The title was changed to Chief of the South African Defence Force a year later.

In 1977, Biermann authored 'The South African Response. The Southern Oceans and the Security of the Free World: New Studies in Global Strategy.

The navy's submarine base was named after him.

Contribution to yachting in South Africa

Following the success of Bruce Dalling and the yacht Voortrekker in the 1968 Single-Handed Trans-Atlantic Race, Biermann, then chairman of the Springbok Ocean Racing Trust, suggested that South Africa host an ocean race of its own.

The South African Ocean Racing Trust (as the SAORT became known) selected the Iate Clube do Rio de Janeiro, who were willing to co-operate in the organising of the race and the race would be known as the Cape to Rio. The first race was organised for 1971, with the organisers anticipating at most 15 entries into the race. However, the race attracted a large amount of interest and 58 boats entered the 1971 race.

Awards and decorations

Biermann received the Star of South Africa on 13 May 1960 in recognition of his exceptionally meritorious services. He was the last recipient of this honour prior to the declaration of the Republic of South Africa on 31 May 1961, which has Queen Elizabeth II's royal cypher on the back above the pre-2000 Coat of arms of South Africa. He was also appointed Grand Cross of Naval Merit of the Order of May from Admiral Guillermo Brown of Argentina, and the Knight Grand Cross of the Order of Infante Dom Henrique of Portugal. He was the very first recipient of the Southern Cross Decoration, which he received upon his retirement as Chief of the South African Defence Force in 1976.

 
 
 
 
 
 
 
 
 
Order of May of Naval Merit (Argentina, Grand Cross degree)
  Grand Cross of the Order of Prince Henry – GCIH

Personal life

In 1940, Biermann married Margaret (Peggy) Cruyws. She died in 2008 at the age of 90. The couple had two children, Hugo Hendrik and Diana.
Biermann died on 27 March 2012 at the age of 95 in a retirement home, Silvermine Village, near Cape Town. He was buried with full military honours.

References

|-

|-

|-

|-

1916 births
Graduates of the Royal Naval College, Greenwich
South African admirals
Royal Naval Volunteer Reserve personnel of World War II
South African military personnel of the Border War
South African Officers of the Order of the British Empire
People from Johannesburg
2012 deaths
Chiefs of the South African Navy
Alumni of Hoërskool Jan van Riebeeck
Royal Navy officers of World War II